RJ Vigneshkanth is a former Indian radio jockey. He started his career as a radio jockey in Aaha FM during his final year of college.

Television

Filmography

As actor

Web series

As lyricist

References

External links
 

Living people
Indian radio presenters
Television personalities from Tamil Nadu
Tamil comedians
Indian YouTubers
Indian male comedians
Year of birth missing (living people)